Julian James Wachner (born September 23, 1969) is an American composer, conductor, and keyboardist. From 2011 to 2022, he served as the Director of Music and the Arts at Trinity Wall Street, conducting the Choir of Trinity Wall Street, the Trinity Baroque Orchestra, and NOVUS NY. Wachner recorded five albums with these ensembles, primarily for the Musica Omnia label. From 2008 to 2017, he served as the Director of The Washington Chorus. In March 2018, Wachner was named Artistic Director of the Grand Rapids Bach Festival, an affiliate of the Grand Rapids Symphony, in Grand Rapids, Michigan.

As a guest conductor, he has led ensembles including the Philadelphia Orchestra, Juilliard Opera, and San Francisco Opera, and has participated in festivals including the Spoleto Festival USA, Glimmerglass Festival, Lincoln Center Festival, BAM Next Wave Festival, and the New York Philharmonic Biennial. As a composer, he has published over 60 musical works (see below), many of which are sacred works for chorus. His complete choral works to date were released in two volumes by Naxos Records in 2010 and 2014. Wachner is the author, with Kevin J. Moroney, of Psalms for All People: An Inclusive-Language Resource for Praying and Singing (Church Publishing) .

On March 13, 2022, The New York Times reported a sexual assault allegation against Wachner, relating to a 2014 incident. Wachner had been put on leave on March 1, 2022, by Trinity Wall Street because of the allegation. He was fired on March 14. Wachner, through an attorney, denied the accusations.

In 2020, Wachner became Professor of Music and the Arts at the General Theological Seminary in Chelsea, but on March 14, 2022, it removed all mentions of him from its website. Wachner has said that he and his family are moving to Indiana, so he is apparently no longer employed at GTS, where his wife Emily Bloemker Wachner was the seminary's Lecturer in Pastoral Theology and Director of Integrative Programs until 2020.

Biography

Julian Wachner was born in 1969 in Hollywood, CA into a musical household—his mother, Mary Spire, was a pianist, and his former stepfather, Robert Cole, was a conductor. He began cello and piano lessons at age 4 at the University of Southern California, and from age 9 to 13, Wachner studied composition in New York at the Saint Thomas Choir School under Gerre Hancock.

Wachner later attended the Boston University College of Fine Arts, where he studied with Lukas Foss, Theodore Antoniou, David Hoose and Marjorie Merryman. While a student there, he was appointed the University Organist and Choirmaster at Marsh Chapel. He graduated in 1996 with a Doctorate of Musical Arts in composition and orchestral conducting and taught as an Assistant Professor of Sacred Music at BU's School of Theology. From 1999 to 2002, he directed the Young Artists Composition Program at the Tanglewood Institute.

During his tenure at BU, Wachner also headed multiple Boston-area arts institutions. In 1995, he and Peter Watchorn founded the Boston Bach Ensemble, a period instrument orchestra and choir. Their recording of Bach's Christmas Oratorio, released in 2001, helped launch Watchorn's Musica Omnia label in 1998. Wachner also served as Director of the Back Bay Chorale, releasing a CD of works by Benjamin Britten with the ensemble in 2001. From 1996 to 2006, he was Director of the Providence Singers in Providence, RI. In 1999 he conducted the premier performance of The Magdelene Passion, by composer Elaine Bearer, with the Providence Singers, an hour-long oratorio with five soloists, chorus, organ and chamber orchestra.

Wachner moved to Montreal in 2001 to become an associate professor at McGill University's Schulich School of Music, a post he held until 2011. As associate professor, Wachner served as the principal conductor of Opera McGill and occasionally conducted the McGill Symphony and Contemporary Music Ensemble. He also founded and directed the Schulich Singers, a chamber choir that performs repertoire spanning all musical periods. While in Montreal, Wachner also founded and directed the Bach-Academie de Montréal (now the Montreal Bach Festival) and served as Director of Music of the Presbyterian Church of St. Andrew and St. Paul.

In 2008, Wachner returned to the United States to direct the Washington Chorus. The Chorus released a CD of Christmas carols in 2010, featuring several arrangements by Wachner himself. Under Wachner's direction, the Chorus also performed with the Rolling Stones in the final concert of their "50 and Counting" tour in 2013.

Wachner was appointed Director of Music and the Arts at Trinity Wall Street in 2011, placing him at the podium of both the church's choir and baroque orchestra. In his first season there, he established NOVUS NY, a contemporary music ensemble. His 2012 recording of Handel's Israel in Egypt with the Trinity Choir and Trinity Baroque Orchestra was nominated for a 2013 Grammy Award for Best Choral Performance.

Composition

Sacred music
Many of Wachner's earlier published works were liturgical in purpose, written during his tenure as University Organist and Choirmaster at Marsh Chapel in the early 1990s.  He first came to public attention  with Canticles (1991, revised 1994), a work for chorus and orchestra written as a response to the Gulf War and as a companion piece to Fauré's Requiem. Consisting of five movements, the work features settings of Biblical texts that bookend three poems by Shelli Jankowski-Smith about the atrocities of war .

These Biblical themes were later expanded upon in his first symphony, titled Incantations and Lamentations, which was commissioned and premiered by the Back Bay Chorale in 2001. Like Canticles, Incantations and Lamentations is a work in five movements for chorus and orchestra. In his program notes, theologian Wesley Wildman writes that the work concerns the "superficial opposition between worship and indictment of God ... and their breathtaking merger in the context of the Biblical story of the Babylonian exile." This analysis is echoed in Matthew Guerrieri's liner notes for the Naxos recording of the Symphony: "It undercuts the confidence of Psalm 103 ('I will praise the Lord as long as I live') with the despair and frustration of Psalm 137 ('by the waters of Babylon we sat down and wept')." Canticles and Symphony No. 1 were later recorded by the Trinity Wall Street Choir and NOVUS NY and included in Complete Choral Works, Vol. 2, released on Naxos in 2014.

Secular music

Outside of the realm of sacred music, Wachner has also composed secular song cycles, including Sometimes I Feel Alive (1998) and Rilke Songs (2001). The former, which Wachner composed at the Tanglewood Music Center while conducting the BUTI Young Artists Chorus, sets three erotic poems by E. E. Cummings: "there is a moon sole", "as is the sea marvelous" and "somewhere I have never travelled". The latter sets six poems about animals by Rainer Maria Rilke: "Die Gazelle", "Der Panther", "Die Flamingos", "Der Schwan", "Schwarze Katze" and "Das Einhorn". Both works were recorded by the Elora Festival Singers and included in Complete Choral Works, Vol. 1, released on Naxos in 2010.

While director of Opera McGill, Wachner premiered Evangeline Revisited, an opera in two acts based on Henry Wadsworth Longfellow's Evangeline. Written to commemorate the 250th anniversary of the 1755 Expulsion of the Acadians, the opera features a French libretto by Université de Montréal professor Alexis Nouss and blends multiple musical styles, including jazz, blues, Puccini-esque opera, fugue and cabaret. The role of Evangeline is split between two sopranos: one who represents Longfellow's vision, and one who serves as a contemporary commentator. The opera received its US premiere at New York City Opera's VOX Festival in 2010.

Come, My Dark-Eyed One, commissioned and premiered by the Back Bay Chorale in 2009, weaves together poems by John Clare, Emily Dickinson and Sara Teasdale in a libretto compiled by soprano Marie-Ève Munger. Originally a companion piece for Brahms's Ein Deutsches Requiem, the work charts the "life and death of two lovers" in eight movements.

In 2012, Wachner collaborated with visual artist Erika Harrsch to create a work for The River to River Festival. The resulting installation, titled Inverted Sky, featured a solo flute score with live electronic processing. This accompanied a collection of kites built from various world currencies that were released into the air in time with the music.

Style

Wachner has described himself "[a]s a composer-conductor perched between the Apollonian world of church music and the academy and the Dionysian world of opera and the stage." In the liner notes of his Complete Choral Works, Vol. 1, he writes of this duality:

For me, I always found this a difficult decision to make, and thus found myself living and working in the no-man’s land between pure post-Impressionism and post-Expressionism—composing music that was criticized as "too simple" from one camp and "too complex" from the other. As I have always considered my compositional process and philosophy to be aligned with the assimilators of previous eras, (Bach, Stravinsky and Foss come to mind)—I have found equal inspiration from strict form or unbridled chaos; tonality, modality or post-tonality; and lyricism, pointillism or minimalism—I find it crucial to have as sweeping a palette of creative possibilities at my disposal as possible, believing that this desire is no different from any composer of the past.

Beth Morrison, an opera producer and longtime collaborator of Wachner's, says of his compositional style: "I see his work as very Americana, firmly following in the steps of Copland and Bernstein." His creative output has also been noted for its multifaceted nature, as in Guerrieri's notes: "Wachner's eclecticism is uncommonly deep, a reflection of his multivalent career: a virtuoso organist, an omnivorous conductor, an exploratory composer; a church musician with a dramatic sense of the sacred and a concert-hall veteran with a reverence for the dramatic."

Sexual assault allegations

On February 28, 2022, Mary Poole, formerly of the Juilliard School, publicly alleged that Wachner sexually assaulted her during a 2014 music festival; she had hired Wachner for a directing job. Wachner has denied these allegations. Following these accusations, on March 1, 2022, Wachner was placed on leave by Trinity Wall Street. The foregoing details were published in The New York Times on March 13, 2022. The next day, Trinity fired Wachner, without having concluded its investigation of the 2014 allegations, because of "recent information that Julian has otherwise conducted himself in a manner that is inconsistent with our expectations of anyone who occupies a leadership position."  On March 18, 2022, Wachner posted his version of the 2014 incident at his website, denying that any nonconsensual activity occurred.

Awards

 2011 — ASCAP Alice Parker Award for Adventurous Programming (with The Washington Chorus)
 2013 — Nominated, Grammy Awards: Best Choral Performance (for Israel in Egypt with the Choir of Trinity Wall Street and Trinity Baroque Orchestra)

Discography

This is a list of recordings by Julian Wachner, either as composer or conductor.

References

Notes

Sources
 ARSIS Audio, "Complete Catalog" 
 Musica Omnia, "Julian Wachner" 
 Naxos, "Julian Wachner" 
 ECS Publishing, "Wachner, Julian"

External links
 
 

1969 births
20th-century American composers
20th-century classical composers
20th-century American conductors (music)
21st-century American composers
21st-century American Episcopalians
21st-century classical composers
21st-century American conductors (music)
American choral conductors
American male conductors (music)
American classical composers
American male classical composers
American performers of Christian music
Anglican religious workers
Classical composers of church music
Boston University College of Fine Arts alumni
Living people
Academic staff of McGill University
Musicians from Los Angeles
People from Hollywood, Los Angeles
Pupils of Lukas Foss
Classical musicians from California
20th-century American male musicians
21st-century American male musicians